"Addicted to Money" is the second single by rapper Lil Scrappy. It features label-mate Ludacris. The music video was shot in Atlanta, Georgia. This song was also performed at the 2009 BET Hip Hop Awards.

Charts

References

External links
 Lil Scrappy "Addicted to Money" Official Video

2009 singles
Lil Scrappy songs
Ludacris songs
Song recordings produced by J.U.S.T.I.C.E. League
Songs written by Ludacris
Songs written by Erik Ortiz
Songs written by Kevin Crowe